Sunbeam Bread is a franchised brand of white bread, rolls, and other baked goods owned by the Quality Bakers of America cooperative. The bread products are produced and distributed by regional bakeries.

History
The brand was launched in 1942 and was first marketed in New Bedford, Massachusetts. Annual sales of the branded bread products exceed $400 million.

Little Miss Sunbeam
Sunbeam's long-time mascot is called Little Miss Sunbeam. In 1942, illustrator Ellen Barbara Segner was commissioned by the Quality Bakers of America to create a marketing symbol of a young child. Over six months she submitted hundreds of sketches before coming across the girl who would become the first Miss Sunbeam in  Southern Indiana. The image of the holiday Little Miss Sunbeam first appeared on a billboard in the 1950s. Flowers Foods, the largest distributor of Sunbeam bread, has used this image of Little Miss Sunbeam on billboards and bread bags during the holiday season, in their Sunbeam markets, since 2001. US soldiers in Vietnam would state that they were members of the "Little Miss Sunbeam Club," as they had no wounds as declared in the "batter-whipped" bread's promotional claim of "no holes" ensuring freshness and firmness.

Licensees
Aunt Millie’s
Bimbo Bakeries USA
Flowers Foods
Lewis Bakeries 
Schmidt Baking Company
Wolf Bakeries

See also
 List of brand name breads

References

External links

 Quality Bakers of America Cooperative website

Flowers Foods brands
Economy of the Eastern United States
Cooperatives in the United States
Brand name breads
Franchises
Products introduced in 1942